Totally Tooned In is an American syndicated television animated cartoon compilation series consisting of theatrical cartoons from the Columbia Pictures and UPA animation studios. The series was produced in 1999 until 2000 by Columbia TriStar International Television (now known as Sony Pictures Television) and broadcast in several international markets before making its American television debut on Antenna TV on January 8, 2011. The series was created by executive producer Rob Word.

Episodes 
The cartoons with "*" are repeats

Format
Each episode includes three full-length cartoons from the 1930s to the 1950s, including the 52 theatrically distributed Mr. Magoo cartoons (13 episodes used repeats), and short clips from other cartoons. The cartoons were remastered from the original 35mm film elements.

References

External links
Totally Tooned In episode guide
Totally Tooned In on IMDB

1990s American animated television series
1990s American anthology television series
1999 American television series debuts
2000s American animated television series
2000s American anthology television series
2000 American television series endings
American children's animated anthology television series
American children's animated comedy television series
First-run syndicated television programs in the United States
English-language television shows
Television series by Sony Pictures Television